Allinson is a surname. Notable people with the surname include:

Adrian Allinson, British painter
Alex Allinson, Manx politician
Alfred Richard Allinson, British academic
Bertrand P. Allinson, British physician
Darren Allinson, Welsh rugby union player
Ian Allinson, English footballer
Leonard Allinson, British diplomat
Lloyd Allinson, English footballer
Mark Allinson, British historian
Michael Allinson, British-American actor
Robert Allinson, American philosopher
Richard Allinson, British broadcaster
Thomas Allinson, British doctor
Vera Allinson, British screenwriter